Ulanga District (Mahenge District) is one of the six districts of the Morogoro Region of Tanzania.  the administrative seat is in Mahenge. Ulanga District is bordered to the north and west by the Kilombero District, to the east by the Lindi Region and to the south by the Ruvuma Region.

Demographics
, the population of the Ulanga District was 194,209. According to the 2012 census the population had risen to 265,203 people. The Wapogoro are the majority ethnic group in Ulanga District.

Economy
Most people are employed in herding and subsistence farming, although there is some traditional fishing. Some mining is done in Lukande Ward.

Roads are poor.  There is one gravelled airstrip located in the Selous Game Reserve.

Administrative subdivisions

Constituencies
For parliamentary elections, Tanzania is divided into constituencies. As of the 2015 elections Ulanga District had one constituency:
 Ulanga Mashariki Constituency (Ulanga East Constituency)

Divisions
Ulanga District is administratively divided into four divisions.
 Lupiro
 Vigoi
 Ruaha
 Mwaya

Wards
Ulanga District is administratively divided into twenty-one wards:

 Chirombola
 Euga
 Ilonga
 Iragua
 Isongo
 Ketaketa
 Kichangani
 Lukande
 Lupiro
 Mahenge
 Mawasiliano
 Mbuga
 Milola
 Minepa
 Msogezi
 Mwaya
 Nawenge
 Ruaha
 Sali
 Uponera
 Vigoi

Notes

Districts of Morogoro Region